This is a partial listing of tributaries of the Fraser River. Tributaries and sub-tributaries are hierarchically listed in upstream order from the mouth of the Fraser River. The list may also include streams known as creeks and sloughs. Lakes are noted in italics.

All of these streams are in British Columbia, Canada, except the upper Vedder River (Chilliwack River) and some of its tributaries, which are in Washington, United States.

Mouth to Harrison River
 Brunette River
 Burnaby Lake
 Still Creek
 Coquitlam River
 Coquitlam Lake
 Pitt River
 Alouette River
 Alouette Lake
 Gold Creek
 Widgeon Creek
 Pitt Lake
 Pitt River
 Kanaka Creek
 McNutt Creek
 Whonnock Creek
 Stave River
 Silvermere Lake
 Hayward Lake
 Hairsine Creek
 Steelhead Creek
 Stave River
 Stave Lake
 Cascade Creek
 Terepocki Creek
 Tingle Creek
 Stave River
 Piluk Creek
 Silver Creek
 D'Herbomez Creek
 Hatzic Slough
 Hatzic Lake
 Durieu Creek
 Norrish Creek

Harrison River system
 Harrison River
 Chehalis River
 Chehalis Lake
 Harrison Lake
 Silver River
 Tretheway Creek
 Tipella Creek
 Lillooet River
 Sloquet Creek
 Fire Creek
 Snowcap Creek
 Lillooet Lake
 Joffre Creek
 Birkenhead River
 Birkenhead Lake
 Taillefer Creek
 Green River
 Rutherford Creek
 Soo River
 Green Lake
 Rainbow Creek
 River of Golden Dreams (Alta Creek)
 Alta Lake
 Brio Creek
 Fitzsimmons Creek
 Ryan River
 Meager Creek
 Salal Creek

Harrison to Thompson River
 Sumas River
 Vedder River (also called Chilliwack River)
 Sweltzer River
 Slesse Creek
 Depot Creek
 Little Chilliwack River
 Ruby Creek
 Coquihalla River
 Nicolum River
 Anderson River
 Nahatlatch River
 Ainslie Creek (formerly Nine Mile Creek)

Thompson River system
 Thompson River
 Botanie Creek
 Nicoamen River
 Skoonka Creek
 Murray Creek
 Nicola River
 Spius Creek
 Coldwater River
 Nicola Lake
 Quilchena Creek
 Oregon Jack Creek
 Bonaparte River
 Cache Creek
 Hat Creek
 Rayfield River
 Deadman River
 Kamloops Lake
 Tranquille River
 South Thompson River
 Monte Creek
 Chase Creek
 Little Shuswap Lake
 Little River
 Shuswap Lake
 Adams River
 Seymour River
 Anstey River
 Eagle River
 Perry River
 Sicamous Narrows
 Mara Lake
 Shuswap River
 Mabel Lake
 Wap Creek
 Shuswap River
 Bessette Creek
 Duteau Creek
 Haddo Lake
 Duteau Creek
 Grizzly Lake
 Heart Creek
 Aberdeen Lake
 Creighton Creek
 Harris Creek
 Sugar Lake
 Shuswap River
 Tsuius Creek
 Joss Creek
 Salmon River
 North Thompson River
 Barrière River
 Clearwater River
 Mahood River
 Mahood Lake
 Canim River
 Canim Lake
 Bridge Creek
 Murtle River
 Clearwater Lake
 Azure River
 Azure Lake
 Angus Horne Lake
 Raft River
 Mad River
 Blue River
 Mud Creek
 Thunder River
 Moonbeam Creek
 Albreda River
 Lempriere Creek

Thompson to Chilcotin River
 Stein River
 Seton River (Seton Creek)
 Cayoosh Creek
 Duffey Lake
 Seton Lake
 Seton River (Seton Portage River)
 Anderson Lake
 McGillivray Creek
 Haylmore Creek
 Gates River
 Bridge River
 Yalakom River
 Carpenter Lake
 Marshall Creek
 Marshall Lake
 Tyaughton Creek
 Liza Creek
 Liza Lake
 Tyaughton Lake
 Tyaughton Creek
 Relay Creek
 Noaxe Creek
 Gun Creek
 Lajoie Creek
 Gun Lake
 Lajoie Creek
 Lajoie Lake
 Leckie Creek
 Slim Creek
 Bridge River
 Hurley River
 Cadwallader Creek
 Downton Lake
 Bridge River
 Nichols Creek
 Churn Creek

Chilcotin River system
 Chilcotin River
 Chilko River
 Taseko River
 Taseko Lake
 Lord River
 Tchaikazan River
 Chilko Lake
 Edmond River
 Chilanko River

Chilcotin to Quesnel River
 Williams Lake River
 Williams Lake
 San Jose River
 West Road River (also called Blackwater River)
 Euchiniko River
 Nazko River
 Snaking River
 Clisbako River
 Baezaeko River
 Coglistiko River
 Kushya River

Quesnel River system
 Quesnel River
 Cariboo River
 Cariboo Lake
 Cariboo River
 Little River
 Matthew River
 Lanezi Lake
 Cariboo River
 Isaac River
 Isaac Lake
 Wolverine River
 Quesnel Lake
 Roaring River
 Mitchell River
 Mitchel Lake
 Niagara Creek
 Horsefly River
 Horsefly Lake

Quesnel to Nechako River
 Cottonwood River
 Swift River
 John Boyd Creek
 Mary Creek

Nechako River system
 Nechako River
 Stuart River
 Stuart Lake
 Necoslie River
 Pinchi Creek
 Pinchi Lake
 Tsilcoh River
 Ocock River
 Tachie River
 Kuzkwa River
 Tezzeron Lake
 Trembleur Lake
 Middle River
 Takla Lake
 Sakeniche River
 Natowite Lake
 Driftwood River
 Kotsine River
 Endako River
 Tchesinkut River
 Tchesinkut Lake
 Burns Lake
 Nautley River
 Fraser Lake
 Stellako River
 François Lake
 Nadina River
 Cheslatta River
 Murray Lake
 Bird Creek
 Cheslatta Lake
 Knapp Creek
 Cheslatta River
 Dog Creek
 Moxley Creek
 Skins Lake Spillway
 Nechako Canyon
 Nechako Reservoir (Kenney Dam)
 Knewstubb Lake (part of Nechako Reservoir)
 Natalkuz Lake (Nechako Reservoir)
 Euchu Reach (Nechako Reservoir)
 Entiako River
 Chelaslie Arm (Nechako Reservoir)
 Chelaslie River
 Blanchet River
 Chief Louis Lake
 Chelaslie River
 Tetachuck River
 Tetachuck Lake (Nechako Reservoir)
 Tetachuck River
 Eutsuk Lake
 Chezko River
 Pondosy Lake
 Intata Reach (Nechako Reservoir)
 Ootsa Lake (Nechako Reservoir)
 Tahtsa Reach (Nechako Reservoir)
 Kasalka Creek
 Troitsa Lake
 Tahtsa Lake (Nechako Reservoir)
 Whitesail Reach (Nechako Reservoir)
 Whitesail Lake (Nechako Reservoir)
 Little Whitesail Lake (Nechako Reservoir)

Nechako River to source
 Salmon River
 Willow River
 McGregor River
 Seebach Creek
 Herrick Creek
 Bad River (James Creek)
 Wishaw Lake
 Bowron River
 Torpy River
 Morkill River
 Goat River
 Milk River
 East Twin Creek
 West Twin Creek
 McKale River
 Doré River
 Castle Creek
 Holmes River
 Raush River
 Kiwa Creek
 Tete Creek
 McLennan River
 Swiftcurrent Creek
 Robson River
 Moose Lake
 Moose River

See also 
 List of British Columbia rivers
 List of rivers of Washington
 List of rivers of the Americas

 
 
Fraser
Fraser River tributaries